Rig Cheshmeh (also Romanized as Rīg Cheshmeh) is a village in Estarabad Rural District, Kamalan District, Aliabad County, Golestan Province, Iran. At the 2006 census, its population was 17, in 8 families.

References 

Populated places in Aliabad County